Pontefract is an historic market town in West Yorkshire, England.

Pontefract may also refer to:

People
 Ella Pontefract (1896–1945), English writer
 Richard de Pontefract (fl. 1320), English Dominican friar
 Pontefract de Lacys' family tree
 Dan Pontefract, Canadian businessperson and writer

Other
 Honour of Pontefract, a medieval English feudal barony which has existed since 1068 in present-day West Yorkshire
 Pontefract cake, a type of small, roughly circular black sweet
 Pontefract Castle, a castle ruin in Pontefract, England